Sir Thomas Hoby, 4th Baronet (after 1706 – 1 June 1744), of Bisham, Berkshire, was an English politician.

He was a Member (MP) of the Parliament of England for Great Marlow in the period  8 April 1732 – 1 June 1744.

References

18th-century births
1744 deaths
Baronets in the Baronetage of England
People from Bisham
Members of the Parliament of Great Britain for English constituencies
British MPs 1727–1734
British MPs 1734–1741
British MPs 1741–1747